The 1956 Illinois gubernatorial election was held in Illinois on November 6, 1956. Incumbent Governor William Stratton, a Republican, narrowly won reelection to a second term. Stratton's narrow victory came despite the fact that the Republican ticket of Dwight D. Eisenhower and Richard Nixon carried the state of Illinois in a landslide in the presidential election.

Election information
The primaries and general election both coincided with those for federal offices (United States President, House, and United States Senate) and those for other state offices. The election was part of the 1956 Illinois elections.

Turnout
In the primaries, turnout was 32.56%, with a total of 1,620,871 votes cast.

In the general election, turnout was 82.69%, with a total of 4,314,611 ballots cast.

Primaries
Primaries were held on April 10, 1960.

Democratic primary
Cook County Treasurer Herbert C. Paschen won the Democratic primary.

Republican primary

General election
Democratic nominee Herbert C. Paschen became embroiled in scandal related to his tenure as Cook County Treasurer. Paschen withdrew as the nominee. Paschen was replaced by Richard B. Austin as Democratic nominee.

References 

Illinois
Illinois gubernatorial elections
gubernatorial